Bogacica  is a village in the administrative district of Gmina Kluczbork, within Kluczbork County, Opole Voivodeship, in south-western Poland.

The village has a population of 1,520.

Notable residents
Walther von Lüttwitz (1859–1942), German general

References

Bogacica